is a railway station on the Keisei Main Line in Arakawa, Tokyo, Japan, operated by the private railway operator Keisei Electric Railway.

Lines
Shim-Mikawashima Station is served by the Keisei Main Line, and is located 3.4 km from the starting point of the line at Keisei Ueno Station. Only "Local" all-stations services stop at this station.

Layout
This station consists of a single elevated island platform serving two tracks.

Platforms

History
Shim-Mikawashima station opened on 19 December 1931.

Station numbering was introduced to all Keisei Line stations on 17 June 2010. Shim-Mikawashima was assigned station number KS03.

See also
 List of railway stations in Japan

References

External links

 Station map 

Railway stations in Tokyo
Keisei Main Line
Railway stations in Japan opened in 1931